The Family is a 1985 album released on Prince's Paisley Park Records label by the band of the same name.

Background
The album consists of eight Minneapolis sound tracks but with a funk-jazz slant. Two of the tracks are instrumentals, and three are ballads; many feature string arrangements by Clare Fischer, marking the beginning of Prince's longstanding association with the Michigan-born composer-arranger. A single was released for "The Screams of Passion", a modest hit that was re-released in 1996 on the Girl 6 soundtrack. A promo version of "High Fashion" was distributed. "Nothing Compares 2 U", an emotional ballad, became more widely known five years later when a cover by Sinéad O'Connor was released as a single to worldwide success.

The album was released on vinyl; following the success of O'Connor's version of "Nothing Compares 2 U" a CD version of the album was released in Japan and Germany/Europe.

Alternate recordings of several of the songs from the project featuring Prince on vocals were recorded, but most remain in the vault at Paisley Park Studios. Prince's original 1984 studio recording of "Nothing Compares 2 U" was not officially released until 2018, when it was issued as a single by Warner Bros. Records in conjunction with his estate.

Chart history
Peak position 14—Billboard R&B Chart (spent 29 weeks on the chart).

Track listing

Personnel 

 St. Paul Peterson - lead vocals
 Susannah Melvoin - lead and backing vocals (tracks 1,3,5, 6, 8)
 Prince - all instruments, except where noted
 Eric Leeds - saxophone (tracks 1-2, 4, 6, 8)
 Clare Fischer - string orchestration
 Wendy Melvoin - rhythm guitar (track 4)

References

1985 debut albums
The Family (band) albums
Albums produced by Prince (musician)
Paisley Park Records albums